The Ethiopian vlei rat (Otomys typus) is a species of vlei rat in the rodent family Muridae.
It is found only in Ethiopia and is considered endemic.

Taxonomy 

Heuglin (1877) initially described the species under the name Oreomys typus.
This species classification and that of the genus Otomys varied extremely throughout the years. Taylor et al. (2011) revised the history of this species and part of the genus in itself. Otomys typus previously contained, as subspecies or synonyms, numerous current-day species, such as :

 Otomys fortior - Charada vlei rat (as a subspecies and later as a synonym)
 Otomys darmouthi - Ruwenzori vlei rat (as a subspecies)
 Otomys helleri - Heller's vlei rat (as a subspecies and later as a synonym)
 Otomys jacksoni - Mount Elgon vlei rat (as a subspecies)
 Otomys orestes - Afroalpine vlei rat (as a subspecies)
 Otomys thomasi - Thomas's vlei rat (as a subspecies and later as a synonym of O. orestes)
 Otomys uzungwensis - Uzungwe vlei rat (as a subspecies)
 Otomys zinki - Mount Kilimanjaro vlei rat  (as a subspecies and later as a synonym of O. orestes).

Furthermore, the 2011 revision of this species-group distinguished 4 species inside O. typus and in Ethiopia :

 Otomys typus 
 Otomys cheesmani sp. nov - Cheesman's vlei rat (Taylor, Lavrenchenko, Carleton, Verheyen, Bennett, Oosthuizen & Maree, 2011)
 Otomys simiensis sp. nov - Simien vlei rat (Taylor, Lavrenchenko, Carleton, Verheyen, Bennett, Oosthuizen & Maree, 2011)
 Otomys yaldeni sp. nov - Yalden's vlei rat (Taylor, Lavrenchenko, Carleton, Verheyen, Bennett, Oosthuizen & Maree, 2011).

Habitat 

Its natural habitats are subtropical or tropical moist montane forests, subtropical or tropical high-altitude shrubland, and subtropical or tropical high-altitude grassland.

Conservation 
It is said to be common.

References

Endemic fauna of Ethiopia
Mammals of Ethiopia
Mammals described in 1877
Otomys
Taxa named by Theodor von Heuglin
Taxonomy articles created by Polbot